Robert Saint-Pé (16 July 1899 – 13 June 1988) was a French athlete. He competed in the men's hammer throw at the 1924 Summer Olympics.

References

External links
 

1899 births
1988 deaths
Athletes (track and field) at the 1924 Summer Olympics
French male hammer throwers
Olympic athletes of France
Place of birth missing